The International Society for Prosthetics and Orthotics (ISPO) is a non-governmental organization of people working in or interested in prosthetics, orthotics, mobility and assistive devices technology.

It was founded in 1970 in Copenhagen, Denmark by a committee chaired by Knud Jansen. It currently has about 3,500 members in over 100 countries.

ISPO, in partnership with the World Health Organization (WHO) has developed the WHO Standards for Prosthetics and Orthotics that were launched in May 2017 at the 16th World Congress of the International Society of Prosthetics and Orthotics (ISPO) in Cape Town, South Africa.

ISPO is also responsible for Prosthetics and Orthotics International, an academic journal that quarterly publishes papers related to Prothetics and Orthotics.

References

External links

Prosthetics
International medical and health organizations
Non-profit organizations based in Copenhagen
1970 establishments in Denmark